Africa Illustrious Award is presented both annually and quarterly to recognize African who have excelled in leadership, philanthropy, community development, business, academia, education, agriculture, among others.

History
The first edition of Africa Illustrious Award was held on 16 December 2020 at Radisson Blu Hotel, Victoria Island, Lagos, Nigeria. The award is organized by My Media Africa.

Awards
The award is an annual and quarterly event. The annual event recognizes individuals who have excelled in leadership, philanthropy, community development, arts, culture and business, while the quarterly event recognizes individuals who have made contributions in service industries and academia.

2020 recipients
The 2020 Africa Illustrious Award took place on 16 December 2020 at Radisson Blu Hotel, Victoria Island, Lagos, Nigeria. It has thirty-five categories.

References

Nigerian awards
Business and industry awards
Awards for contributions to society
Humanitarian and service awards
Awards established in 2020